Stenoptilia pneumonanthes, also known as the gentian plume, is a moth of the family Pterophoridae found in central Europe and Russia (the Caucasus). It was first described by Friedrich Otto Büttner in 1880.

Its wingspan is 17–22 mm. Adults are on wing from May to September.

Young larvae feed on the flowers and buds of marsh gentian (Gentiana pneumonanthe) and star gentian (Gentiana cruciata). Later instars also feed on the flowers, but may also feed on foliage. Pupation takes place on the stem or part of the flower and lasts about two weeks.

References

External links
 microlepidoptera.nl

pneumonanthes
Leaf miners
Moths described in 1880
Plume moths of Europe